Pseudophallus elcapitanensis is a species of marine fish belonging to the family Syngnathidae. They can be found within freshwater rivers and streams in Central America from Jimenez, Costa Rica to Rio Chico, Panama.

References

External links 

 Pseudophallus elcapitanensis  at FishBase

Syngnathidae
Fish described in 1914